Francesco Nullo was the name of at least two ships of the Italian Navy and may refer to:

 , a  launched in 1914. Renamed Fratelli Cairoli in 1921 and sunk in 1940.
 , a  launched in 1925 and sunk in 1940.

Italian Navy ship names